Philip Johnston (born October 26, 1971) is an American screenwriter, director, film producer, and voice actor best known for writing the screenplay for Walt Disney Animation Studios' Wreck-It Ralph (2012) and Zootopia (2016). He returned as the writer for the Wreck-It Ralph sequel, Ralph Breaks the Internet (2018) and as co-director of the film (in his directorial debut) alongside Rich Moore.

Early life and career
Johnston was born in Minneapolis to Beverly & William Johnston. He was raised in Neenah, Wisconsin. His father was an Episcopal priest. When he was young, he received an annual pass that allowed him free entry into the Marcus Theatres, a Wisconsin-based theater chain, through a connection at his father's church. Johnston is a graduate of Neenah High School.

He graduated from the University of Wisconsin–Madison in 1994 with a degree in journalism. After graduation he worked in regional news television for nine years. His first job was as a weatherman in Rochester, Minnesota despite knowing nothing about meteorology. He then worked as a bureau reporter at the Omaha, Nebraska, ABC affiliate, KETV. Afterwards, he transferred to KARE station in Minneapolis.

Johnston graduated with a MFA in film from Columbia University School of the Arts' Film Program in 2004. He was classmates with Jennifer Lee, whom he later brought on to co-write Wreck-It Ralph with.

His short, Flightless Birds, about a community of five trying to save their town was shot in South Dakota.

After graduation, Johnston sold his first work to ABC. The half hour comedy, Life is Super, is about a woman who adopts several children and subsequently turning her experience into a podcast.

Johnston optioned his first feature script to ThinkFilm before it went bankrupt. Jeremy Orm Is a Pervert is about the intersection of a preacher's career and his son's pornography business. This was loosely based on his side hustle back in middle school selling pornographic magazines he acquired from upperclassmen to his classmates. He managed to buy a pair of Air Jordans with the profits before eventually getting the operation shut down by his parents.

His script for Cedar Rapids (2011) was included in the 2009 Black List (survey), a list voted by members of the entertainment industry for favorite, unproduced screenplays.

Personal life 
Johnston met his wife, Jill Cordes, while working as a reporter at KETV, Nebraska, where she was a morning anchor.

While attending Columbia, he lived in Brooklyn with his wife, Jill. He was neighbors with film critic Christy Lemire.

Filmography

Feature films

Short films

Other Credits

Awards and nominations

References

External links
 

People from Hennepin County, Minnesota
1971 births
Living people
American animated film directors
American animated film producers
American male screenwriters
American male voice actors
Animation screenwriters
Annie Award winners
Male actors from Minnesota
Screenwriters from Minnesota
Walt Disney Animation Studios people
Film producers from Minnesota
University of Wisconsin–Madison School of Journalism & Mass Communication alumni
Columbia University School of the Arts alumni